A run, straight or sequence is a combination of playing cards where cards have consecutive rank values. They need not normally be of the same suit. However, if they are, this is referred to as a suit sequence. Some games, such as cribbage, specify that an ace counts as one ("ace low"); others specify that an ace counts above a King ("ace high"); yet others, such as poker, allow an ace to count either high or low.

Runs are one of the two types of meld that may be used in games where melding is part of the play; the other being a set or group, such as a pair or triplet.

A natural sequence, as opposed to one that is wild, is one that consists purely of 'natural cards', without any wild cards such as jokers or deuces.

Examples

See also
Meld (cards)
Set (cards)
Straight (poker)

References 

Card game terminology